The III (Germanic) SS Panzer Corps (III. (germanisches) SS-Panzerkorps) was a Waffen-SS armoured corps which saw action on the Eastern Front during World War II. The (Germanische) (lit. Germanic) part of its designation was granted as it was composed primarily of foreign volunteer formations.

History
The corps was formed in April 1943 as a headquarters for the SS Panzergrenadier Division Wiking and the 11th SS Panzergrenadier Division Nordland. The corps was placed under the control of former Wiking commander SS-Obergruppenführer Felix Steiner. After training, the corps took part in operations against Yugoslav partisans. The corps was then sent to a quiet sector in Army Group North, now made up of the Nordland Division and the 4th SS Volunteer Panzergrenadier Brigade Netherlands. By this stage, Wiking had been sent south and came under the control of Army Group South's Eighth Army.

Forced back by the 1944 Soviet winter offensive, the corps participated in the Battle for Narva Bridgehead in the summer of 1944. It then retreated with the rest of the army group across Estonia and into the Courland Peninsula. Transferred to the Oder Front and placed under Steiner's 11th SS Panzer Army, the corps participated in Operation Solstice before being assigned as the reserve corps to the 3rd Panzer Army.

Commanders
 SS-Obergruppenführer Felix Steiner (1 May 1943 – 30 October 1944)
 SS-Obergruppenführer Georg Keppler (30 October 1944 – 4 February 1945)
 SS-Obergruppenführer Matthias Kleinheisterkamp (4 February 1945 – 11 February 1945)
 Generalleutnant Martin Unrein (11 February 1945 – 5 March 1945)

 SS-Obergruppenführer Felix Steiner (5 March 1945 – 8 May 1945)

Order of battle
15 June 1944 — Narva Front
 103rd SS Heavy Panzer Battalion
  11th SS Volunteer Panzergrenadier Division Nordland
  20th Waffen Grenadier Division of the SS
 4th SS Volunteer Panzergrenadier Brigade Nederland

16 September 1944
 103rd SS Heavy Panzer Battalion
  11th SS Volunteer Panzergrenadier Division Nordland
  20th Waffen Grenadier Division of the SS
 4th SS Volunteer Panzergrenadier Brigade Nederland
  5th SS Volunteer Assault Brigade Wallonien
  6th SS Volunteer Assault Brigade Langemarck
  11th Infantry Division
 300th Special Infantry Division

References

Waffen-SS corps
Military units and formations established in 1943
Military units and formations disestablished in 1945